Aphanizomenon flos-aquae is a brackish and freshwater species of cyanobacteria found around the world, including the Baltic Sea and the Great Lakes.

Ecology

Aphanizomenon flos-aquae can form dense surface aggregations in freshwater (known as "cyanobacterial blooms"). These blooms occur in areas of high nutrient loading, historical or current.

Toxicity
Aphanizomenon flos-aquae has both toxic and nontoxic forms. Most sources worldwide are toxic, containing both hepatic and neuroendotoxins.

Most cyanobacteria (including Aphanizomenon) produce BMAA, a neurotoxin amino acid implicated in ALS/Parkinsonism.

Toxicity of A. flos-aquae has been reported in Canada, Germany and China.

Aphanizomenon flos-aquae is known to produce endotoxins, the toxic chemicals released when cells die. Once released (lysed), and ingested, these toxins can damage liver and nerve tissues in mammals. In areas where water quality is not closely monitored, the World Health Organization has assessed toxic algae as a health risk, citing the production of anatoxin-a, saxitoxins, and cylindrospermopsin. Dogs have been reported to have become ill or have fatal reactions after swimming in rivers and lakes containing toxic A. flos-aquae.

Microcystin toxin has been found in all 16 samples of A. flos-aquae products sold as food supplements in Germany and Switzerland, originating from Lake Klamath: 10 of 16 samples exceeded the safety value of 1 μg microcystin per gram. University professor Daniel Dietrich warned parents not to let children consume A. flos-aquae products, since children are even more vulnerable to toxic effects, due to lower body weight, and the continuous intake might lead to accumulation of toxins. Dietrich also warned against quackery schemes selling these cyanobacteria as medicine against illnesses such as attention deficit hyperactivity disorder, causing people to omit their regular drugs.

Medical research

A Canadian study studying the effect of A. flos-aquae on the immune and endocrine systems, as well as on general blood physiology, found that eating it had a profound effect on natural killer cells (NKCs). A. flos-aquae triggers the movement of 40% of the circulating NKCs from the blood to tissues.

As a food supplement

Some compressed tablets of powdered A. flos-aquae cyanobacteria (named as "blue green algae") have been sold as food supplements, notably those filtered from Upper Klamath Lake in Oregon.

See also
Spirulina (dietary supplement)

References

External links
 

Nostocales